The Bordelois class was a class of 56-gun ships of the line, designed by Antoine Groignard. This was a unique type, designed to provide a battlefleet armament (with 36-pounder guns in the principal battery) on a hull able to operate in the shallow waters around Dunkirk. The ships were funded by don des vaisseaux donations and rushed into production for the Seven Years' War, but were completed too late to take part in the conflict. The Flamand would later have a distinguished career during the War of American Independence.

 Ships in class 

 
Builder: Bordeaux shipyard
Ordered: 3 November 1761
Laid down: August 1762
Laid down: July 1762
Launched: 26 April 1763
Completed: July 1763 
Fate: Cut down into a frigate in 1779 and renamed Artois; captured by the Royal Navy on 1 July 1780, recommissioned as HMS Artois, then sold February 1786 to break up.

 
Builder: Bordeaux shipyard
Ordered: 3 November 1761
Laid down: August 1762
Launched: 10 October 1763
Completed: December 1763
Fate: Sold to the Ottoman Navy in August 1774

 
Builder: Bordeaux shipyard
Ordered: 3 November 1761
Laid down: August 1762
Laid down: May 1763
Launched: 14 August 1764
Completed: December 1764
Fate: Condemned in December 1771 at Rochefort and hulked there by 1773.

 
Builder: Bordeaux shipyard
Ordered: 3 November 1761
Laid down: August 1762
Laid down: October 1763
Launched: 11 May 1765
Completed: July 1765
Fate: Condemned 1785-86 at Rochefort and struck.

References

Winfield, Rif and Roberts, Stephen (2017) French Warships in the Age of Sail 1626-1786: Design, Construction, Careers and Fates. Seaforth Publishing. .

 
56-gun ship of the line classes
Ship of the line classes from France
 
Ship classes of the French Navy